Pennellville Historic District  is a residential district located in Brunswick, Maine. To locals, the neighborhood is known simply as "Pennellville."

Pennellville is significant for two main reasons: it has several historic ship captains' mansions, and much of the real estate is waterfront property. The real estate in Pennellville is some of the most expensive in the state of Maine.  
 
The area's historic significance centers on the fact that the Pennell family founded a shipbuilding company and shipyard there. The company built wooden ships there for the 18th and 19th century shipping trade. Their company was Pennell Brothers, and it was one of the most successful shipbuilding companies in the country. The shipyard was located in the cove at Pennellville.

Geography and government

Geography
Pennellville is located in the southern portion of Brunswick, Maine, on the Atlantic Ocean. It sits on a cove known as Middle Bay Cove. The greater bay where it sits is known as Middle Bay, which is a part of the still larger Casco Bay. No official boundaries of Pennellville have ever been designated.

Local government
Pennellville is part of the town of Brunswick, Maine, and has no government of its own. Residents use Brunswick's post office, police department, fire and rescue departments, library, and public school system. Residents of Pennellville are also subject to Brunswick's town taxation system and Maine's state taxation system.

History

Native Americans
Before the arrival of white settlers, Pennellville and Brunswick were inhabited by Native Americans. The greater area was known as "Pejepscot" at the time, and encompassed the modern-day town of Brunswick and other nearby towns. Native Americans left the area by the year 1725.

European settlers
Pennellville was settled by Thomas Pennell, who moved to Brunswick from Falmouth before 1765. Contrary to what appears in many sources, Thomas Pennell was not the son of Thomas Pennell of Gloucester, Massachusetts, nor is there any reliable evidence that he came from the Channel Islands. Thomas Pennell's history before his 1735 marriage to Rachel Riggs remains unknown. Thomas had five sons (four of them being John, Thomas, Matthew and Stephen). His second son was Thomas Pennell II (1739–1812), who married, about 1768, Alice Anderson. Thomas II lived in the Brunswick area, becoming a tax collector and was a shipwright in the 1790s.  He married Alice Anderson of Freeport, Maine. Thomas II and Alice had five sons and five daughters.  Thomas II taught these sons the shipbuilding trade. Together, they expanded their shipbuilding activities and merchant shipping business in the period around 1800.

The fifth child and second son of Thomas II was Jacob Pennell, (1778–1841). He was the most prosperous of the five sons, and built at least twenty ships in Middle Bay (the larger bay upon which Pennellville sits) between 1810 and 1841. He acquired most of the land at Pennellville (land originally owned by his father) by buying the lots that had been divided amongst his brothers. He then built a house with his new-found wealth. At the beginning of the 21st century, his house, the Jacob Pennell Mansion, is the oldest standing house in Pennellville.

Pennellville today
Housing development has been relatively sparse, and much of Pennellville remains wooded areas and open fields. However, the area has become somewhat more developed since the 1980s. Because of its historical significance, Pennellville was added to the National Register of Historic Places in 1985.  Evidence of the shipyard still exists. The ways (the wooden rails a ship was launched down) can still be seen sitting in the bay at low tide. Another visible feature of the yard is the hall where the shipyard workers lived, located at the very end of Pennellville Road, on the east side of the road.

Shipbuilding
The earliest records show that the Pennell family was building wooden cargo ships around 1760 in the Pennellville shipyard. Pennell ships carried all sorts of cargoes; among them were timber, deadstock, wine, guano, salt, and fruit. Often they would also transport people as passengers from port to port for a fee. It is noted, however, that the company was never involved in the American slave trade. Over the next 114 years (1760–1874), the Pennell family would build in excess of ninety ships in Pennellville. This made them one of the wealthiest and most famous shipbuilding families in all of America. The Pennell family entered into a massive shipbuilding boom, and became one of the families of the fabled American shipbuilding era. Sometimes the family they would retain ownership, and charge clients for shipping cargo. In other instances, the family would sell a ship. The Pennells were also captains of many of the ships they built. 

With the wealth acquired from the massively successful shipbuilding business, more mansions began to follow. Jacob had several sons and, around this time, they christened the company "Pennell Brothers." The area where their activities were centered soon became known as "Pennellville."

Pennellville was soon considered its own community, and three roads in the area would bear the Pennell name: Pennellville Road, Old Pennellville Road, and Pennell Way. Soon the area had its own schoolhouse and signs designating the area as being separate from Brunswick. Another road in Pennellville, Tedesco Way, is named for a Pennell ship. In all, the Pennells built seven mansions in the area between 1760 and 1877.

Pennell Brothers Shipbuilding Company
The business operated out of the shipyard located in Pennellville. The site of the yard, including the "ways" from which a ship was launched, was located in the Pennellville bay (known as Middle Bay Cove). The shipyard was moved to three locations in the bay during the operation of the company. The first site was located deep inland, farthest away from the entrance to the ocean. The yard was moved twice after this, getting successively closer to the open ocean with each move.

Ships
The ships the Pennells built are generally referred to as "tall ships." However, they built many different types of tall ships, more specifically classified as barques, schooners, sloops, and brigs. The largest ships weighed over 2,800,000 lbs. (1,400 tons), while the smallest weighed as little as 90,000 lbs. (45 tons). The Benjamin Sewall, the biggest ship ever built by the Pennells, weighed 2,866,000 lbs. (1,433 tons). Completed in 1874, it would also prove to be the last ship the Pennells ever built. In 1903, it sank and was lost off Taiwan (known at the time as Formosa).

Demise of the shipyard
By the end of the 19th century, metal-hulled steamships had replaced wooden ships as a means of transporting goods. Railroads had also come into their own as a means of shipping. By the end of the 19th century, it was faster and safer to ship cargoes by railroad from New York City to San Francisco than it was to sail around Cape Horn. Wooden sailing ships were becoming obsolete.

In 1865, James Pennell (the master builder of the Pennell Brothers company) died as a result of an accident in the shipyard. He was 56 years old. As James was the last master-builder of the Pennell family, his death was likely a major blow to the workings of the yard. By the early 20th century, the shipyard had gone out of business.

Historic homes

With their new-found fortunes, the Pennell family began building mansions along Pennellville Road. Only six of those seven are still standing. The names of the mansions are as follows:

Thomas Pennell II House (1720–1770), son of Thomas Pennell. 35 Pennellville Road. No longer standing. Pennells lived in the current circa-1785 building until 1870. Bowdoin College purchased the property in 1968, after its period as the Coleman Research Farm. It was later sold back for use a private residence
Jacob Pennell House (1778–1841), son of Thomas Pennell III. 149 Pennellville Road. Built 1794; expanded 1806. Federal style residence, one-and-one-half stories high with clapboard siding and gable roof
Benjamin D. Pennell House (1804–1861), son of Jacob Pennell. 287 Pennellville Road. Built 1834.  Greek Revival style residence, two stories high with clapboard siding and gable roof. Recessed porch with classical columns on east wing. One story service wing extending from east side with one-and-one-half story barn built in 1876. Around 1900 it became a popular summer boarding house, Bay View Farm, and Helen Keller was one of its guests. It is now Middle Bay Farm Bed & Breakfast
James Pennell House (1809–1865), son of Jacob Pennell. 257 Pennellville Road. Built 1838. Greek Revival style residence, two stories high with clapboard siding, gable roof and hexagonal cupola. One story porch with classical columns on south side of main structure, attached carriage barn on west end. The façade of the house has been remodelled in that the nine windows are now evenly spaced on the second floor. The cupola has also been given a new aluminum top, a material also now used on the roof
Charles S. Pennell House (1815–1900), son of Jacob Pennell. 292 Pennellville Road. Built 1843. Greek Revival style residence, two stories high with gable roof, clapboard siding, classical entrance on east facade, one story porch on south side. Large two-and- one-half story barn with clapboard siding, gable roof and Italianate style cupola to rear (west) of the house. Charles was the treasurer of Pennell Bros
William Pennell House (1781–1832), son of Thomas Pennell III. 258 Pennellville Road. The original building was erected in 1780. It was later enlarged and remodeled in 1862. Greek Revival style residence, two stories high, clapboard siding, hipped roof, small one story classical portico over east entrance, adjoining two-and-one-half story carriage barn. Jacob II (1807–1882, son of Jacob Pennell) lived here during the days of the Pennell Bros. shipyard. Pennells lived here until the 1900s
Job Pennell House (1812–1868), son of Jacob Pennell. Built circa 1860. Greek Revival style, two story residence with vinyl siding, gable roof, one-and-one-half story ell and carriage barn

There is also a carpenter shop (built circa 1850). One-and-one-half story structure with gable roof and clapboard siding. Extending across east facade is a veranda with Italianate style brackets.

Captain Abby and Captain John 
A notable relative of the Pennell family was Pulitzer Prize-winning writer Robert P. T. Coffin (1892–1955). Coffin was the brother of Alice Pennell, and lived in the Jacob Pennell II Mansion (formerly the home of William Pennell). Robert Coffin wrote the critically acclaimed novel Captain Abby and Captain John (1939), a novel about two Pennell ship captains.

See also
National Register of Historic Places listings in Cumberland County, Maine

References

General

Specific
From the Falls to the Bay: A tour of historic Brunswick, Maine, 1980

External links
National Park Service National Register of Historic Places Inventory - Nomination Form
"Remembering Brunswick’s shipbuilding past" - The Times Record, July 14, 2017
"Pennellville historic district is a special Brunswick village" - The Times Record, March 27, 2018

Federal architecture in Maine
Italianate architecture in Maine
Greek Revival architecture in Maine
Historic districts in Cumberland County, Maine
Historic districts on the National Register of Historic Places in Maine
Brunswick, Maine
National Register of Historic Places in Cumberland County, Maine